Olivier Zuchuat is a Swiss film director.
Born in 1969 in Geneva.
After studying theoretical physics at  EPFL and Trinity College and literature he became a teaching assistant at the University of Lausanne (Switzerland). He directed several theatrical productions of works by Bertolt Brecht and Heiner Müller and also worked as assistant with the German theater director Matthias Langhoff (Théâtre Nanterre-Amandiers).
Since 2001, he dedicates himself mainly with cinema.
Since 2006, he has been teaching film studies at the Université de Paris-Est Marne la Vallée and at LA FEMIS Cinema School (Paris).

Filmography 
 2012 : Like Stone lions at the gateway into night (86 minutes, DCP)
 2008 : Far from the villages (75 minutes, 35mm), documentary film on a refugees camp in Chad Darfur
 2005 : Djourou, a rope round your neck (63 minutes), documentary film on the debt crisis in Mali
 2001 : Mah Damba, une griotte en exil (57 minutes), documentary film on the singer Mah Damba, co-directed with Corinne Maury

Awards 
 Best documentary "Regard sur le monde" –  Festival Vues d’Afriques, Montréal 2005
 Médiathèques Award, FIDMarseille 2008
 Quartz 2009 - Swiss Cinema Award, Nomination  for best documentary film
 International Film Festival Innsbruck 2009 - Best Documentary
 Nuremberg International Human Rights Film Award 2009 - Nomination
 DOK Leipzig 2013 - Oecumenical Jury Award (International Competition)
 Festival International du Film Méditerranéen de Tétouan 2013 - Jury Award
 Festival International du film Insulaire (Groix 2014) - Jury Award (special mention)

External links 
 www.olivierzuchuat.net 

Director's portrait at Swissfilms
site for the film Far from the villages at IMDB

Living people
1969 births
Film people from Geneva
Alumni of Trinity College Dublin
École Polytechnique Fédérale de Lausanne alumni
Swiss documentary film directors